Manhattan Valley Viaduct may refer to either of two crossings of Manhattan Valley:
 Riverside Drive Viaduct
 The rail viaduct of the IRT Broadway–Seventh Avenue Line, site of the 125th Street station